Aksakovo is a rural locality (a village) in Karmaskalinsky Selsoviet, Karmaskalinsky District, Bashkortostan, Russia. The population was 28 as of 2010. There are 5 streets.

Geography 
Aksakovo is located 9 km southeast of Karmaskaly (the district's administrative centre) by road. Novotroitsk is the nearest rural locality.

References 

Rural localities in Karmaskalinsky District